The Jetavanarama stupa or Jetavanaramaya is a stupa, or Buddhist reliquary monument, located in the ruins of Jetavana monastery in the UNESCO world heritage city of Anuradhapura, Sri Lanka. At 122 metres (400 ft), it was the world's tallest stupa, and the third tallest structure in the world when it was built by King Mahasena of Anuradhapura (273–301). He initiated the construction of the stupa following the destruction of the Mahaviharaya of Anuradhapura. His son Maghavanna I completed the construction of the stupa, and it was renovated by Parakramabahu I of Polonnaruwa. A part of a sash or belt tied by the Buddha is believed to be the relic that is enshrined here.

With the destruction and abandonment of Anuradhapura kingdom in the 11th century, the stupa with others was covered by jungle. King Parakramabahu in 12th century tried to renovate this stupa and it was rebuilt to the current height, a reduction from the original height.

The compound covers approximately 5.6 hectares and is estimated to have housed 10,000 Buddhist monks.

Approximately 93.3 million baked bricks were used in its construction; the engineering ingenuity behind the construction of the structure is a significant development in the history of the island.

Conception and History 

Following king Jettha Tissa's death his brother Mahasena was consecrated as king by Mahayana monk Sanghamitta; under the monk's influence king Mahasena brought about a campaign against Theravadins dwelling in the Mahavihara. The differences between the Theravadins and Mahayanins escalated to an extent to which a penalty was established to any person providing alms to monks dwelling in the mahavihara. The Mahavamsa quotes Sanghamitta: "The dwellers in the Mahavihara do not teach the (true) vinaya, we are those who teach the (true) vinaya, O king".

The Mahavihara was eventually abandoned. The monks dwelling at the premises moved to Malaya country and the Principality of Ruhuna, this was followed by the pillaging of Mahavihara by Sanghamitta and minister Sona, all valuable were transferred to Abhayagiri vihāra.

The pillaging led to a rebellion by minister Meghavannabhaya, he raised an army from Malaya, and set camp by the Duratissaka tank. King Mahasena marched an army to meet minister Meghavannabhaya, where negotiations were reached night before the battle, and the king apologized for the pillaging and agreed to build a vihara at the grounds of Mahavihara, the Mahavamsa quotes the king: " will make the vihara to be dwelt in yet again; forgive me my fault". Sanghamitta was assassinated by a laborer on the instructions of a wife of the king, Sangamitta's demise and the construction of parivena by minister Meghavannabhaya marked the return of monks to the site of Mahavihara.

Thus the construction of Jetavanaramaya began and was offered to the monk Tissa, but later the monk was accused of a grave offense upon investigation and proof by a minister, monk Tissa was eventually disrobed and expelled from the order. The Dakkhinagiri monks were then entrusted with the premises of Jetavana.

Late history

The Jetavanaramaya was under the monks of the Sagalika sect. The Sagalica sect was closely linked with the Abhyagiri viharaya. Towards the end of the Anuradhapura period, Jetavana monastery had developed into one of the three fraternities in the island along with Mahavihara and Abhyagiriya. The fraternities were united during the reign of King Parakramabahu I, who carried out pro-orthodox reforms against unorthodox or limited Theravadins.

Name and location

The importance of the Jetavanaramaya's location is that, Mahinda, who brought Buddhism to Sri Lanka, took up residence here to preach Dharma. Thus the forest was named Joitavana and was later called Jetavana.

Design and construction

As the largest ancient stupa constructed and one of the tallest ancient structures in the world, the structural ingenuity and engineering skills employed for the construction are significant. The foundations of the structure were 8.5m deep and the size of the structure required bricks which could withstand loads of up to 166 kg. The solid foundation lay on bed-rock and the dome was constructed of full and half bricks and earth fill, the unique shape of a perfect ellipsoid allowed for stress and thus allowed the construction of the large structure.
The Mahavamsa describes the foundation laying, where fissures were filled with stones and stamped down by elephants whose feet were protected with leather bindings. The bricks used for the construction were a significant development of ancient Sri Lankan engineering, the bricks used for Jetavanaramaya had a composition of 60 percent fine sand and 35 percent clay, the bricks could withstand .

Finely crushed dolomite, limestone, sieved sand and clay provided the bonding material for the bricks. The clay employed was pliable and thus accommodates movement within the structure. One of the sides of the brick was roughened to trap the bonding slurry thus limiting lateral movement. The stupa was then covered with lime plaster; the plaster used contained seashells, sugar syrup, egg whites, coconut water, glues, oils, plant resin, sand, clay and pebbles. The plaster also provided waterproofing for the structure. The Mahavamsa also mentions the use of copper sheets over the foundation and arsenic dissolved in sesame oil to prevent insect and plant intrusions inside the stupa. It is estimated that Jetavanaramaya took 15 years to complete and would have required a skillful workforce of hundreds, including brickyard workers and bricklayers, and stonemasons.

Conservation

Until 1909, the colossal structure was covered with shrub jungle. Monk Kumbuke Dhammarama of Sailabimbaramaya temple of Gammanpita received approval to clear the stupa. The approval was however, canceled as the monk decided to settle down. Polonnaruwe Sobita sought and received permission to continue clearing the premises but approval was once again canceled when the monk initiated the collection of contributions. However, the monk refused to leave.

Conservation in the late 1990s was funded by the income from ticket sales, mainly to foreign tourists to the three cultural triangle sites of Anuradhapura, Polonnaruwa and Sigiriya. Bricks were burned using the same kind of mixture that was used by the builders of the original dagoba. There have however been a decline of the city due to the significant war that existed in the late 1990s, on the other hand, shortages of bricks led to slowering of the conservation of the dagoba.

Excavations

Excavations have revealed artifacts indicating that Sri Lanka was the primary entrepot for trade activity connecting the Indian rim countries as well as the Mediterranean and the Far East, and artistic influences that point to a shared culture in South Asia.

See also 
Ancient stupas of Sri Lanka
List of tallest structures built before the 20th century
Timeline of three tallest structures in the world
Ancient Constructions of Sri Lanka
Architecture of ancient Sri Lanka
Architecture of Sri Lanka
Ruwanwelisaya
Atamasthana
Mahawamsa
Kalinga Magha

Notes

Further reading 
Ratnayake, Hema (1993) Jetavana. In The Cultural Triangle of Sri Lanka. Paris: Unesco Publishing/CCF.
Schroeder, Ulrich von. (1990). Buddhist Sculptures of Sri Lanka. (752 p.; 1620 illustrations). Hong Kong: Visual Dharma Publications, Ltd.

External links 

 Discover Sri Lanka - More information & images about Jetavana Dagaba

Stupas in Anuradhapura
Buildings and structures completed in the 4th century
12th-century Buddhist temples
Archaeological sites in Sri Lanka
Buddhist pilgrimage sites in Sri Lanka
Tourist attractions in Sri Lanka
Buddhist temples in Anuradhapura
Archaeological protected monuments in Anuradhapura District